Children's Discovery Museum or similar names may refer to:

Thailand
 Children’s Discovery Museum Bangkok 1

United States
(by state, then city)
 Bay Area Discovery Museum, Fort Baker, Sausalito, California
 Children's Discovery Museum of the Desert (CDMOD), Rancho Mirage, California
 Children's Discovery Museum of San Jose, California
 Children's Discovery Museum (VTA), a light-rail station next to the museum

 Hawaii Children's Discovery Center, Honolulu, Hawaii
 Kauai Children's Discovery Museum, a defunct museum in Kauai, Hawaii

 Children's Discovery Museum, Normal, Illinois
 Discovery Center Museum, Rockford, Illinois; part of the National Space Grant College and Fellowship Program

 Kansas Children's Discovery Center, Topeka, Kansas

 

 Maine Discovery Museum, Bangor, Maine
 Port Discovery (museum) or Port Discovery Children's Museum, Baltimore, Maryland
 Discovery Museum (Acton, Massachusetts)

 Garden State Discovery Museum, Cherry Hill, New Jersey
 Discovery Children's Museum, Las Vegas, Nevada

 Boonshoft Museum of Discovery, a children's museum in Dayton, Ohio
 Creative Discovery Museum, Chattanooga, Tennessee
 Discovery Center at Murfree Spring, Murfreesboro, Tennessee
 Children's Discovery Museum , Victoria, Texas
 Virginia Discovery Museum, a children's museum in Charlottesville, Virginia

See also
 Children's Library Discovery Center, Jamaica, Queens, New York
 Children's museum
 Discovery Museum, Newcastle upon Tyne, England
 Hands On Children's Museum, a children's museum in Olympia, Washington
 List of children's museums in the United States, many of which have "Discovery" in the name